Li Xuejian (born February 20, 1954) is a veteran Chinese actor, best known for portraying Song Jiang in The Water Margin television series, CCTV's 1998 adaptation of the classical novel of the same title. Li also played the various historical military and political figures in the Chinese Civil War, and acted in the 2006 film The Go Master based on the biography of go player Go Seigen.

Personal life
In 1983, Li Xuejian married Yu Haidan, an actress from Kongzheng Art Troupe. The couple has a son, Li Gen.

Filmography

Film

Television

Film and television awards

References

External links

Li Xuejian at the Chinese Movie Database

1954 births
Living people
Male actors from Shandong
People from Juye County
Chinese male television actors
Chinese male film actors
20th-century Chinese male actors
21st-century Chinese male actors